Govinda Subba Limbu is the first Governor of Province No. 1 of Nepal. In a meeting on 17 January 2018, the government of Nepal appointed him as the Chief of State of Province No. 1. He is a professor at Centre for Nepal and Asian Studies (CNAS) of Tribhuvan University. He was involved in Nepali Communist Movement with ANNFSU in Dhankuta before joining NC.

See also
 Ratneshwar Lal Kayastha
 Anuradha Koirala
 Baburam Kunwar
 Durga Keshar Khanal
Mohan Raj Malla

References

External links

Living people
Nepali Congress politicians from Koshi Province
1958 births
People from Dhankuta District
Governors of Koshi Province